The Kurdistan Region Governorate elections were held on 30 April 2014. The elections for the three Kurdish governorates coincided with the elections for Iraqi parliament.

Result

Arbil Governorate

Duhok Governorate

Sulaymaniyah Governorate

References

Governorate elections
April 2014 events in Iraq
2014